John Rex Farm, also known as Goodwin/Strickler Farm, is a historic home and farm located at Jefferson Township in Greene County, Pennsylvania. The main house was built about 1874, and is a -story, frame dwelling with a steeply pitched gable roof in the Gothic Revival style.  The house was renovated in 1990, at which time a full basement was added.  Also on the property are the contributing summer kitchen (c. 1865), barn (c. 1870), carriage house (c. 1870), smokehouse (c. 1870), and a wrought iron fence (c. 1910).

It was listed on the National Register of Historic Places in 1998.

References 

Houses on the National Register of Historic Places in Pennsylvania
Gothic Revival architecture in Pennsylvania
Houses completed in 1874
Houses in Greene County, Pennsylvania
National Register of Historic Places in Greene County, Pennsylvania